Matt Murley (born December 17, 1979) is an American former professional ice hockey forward who played with the Pittsburgh Penguins and Phoenix Coyotes in the National Hockey League (NHL). He is currently a Sports betting expert for Barstool Sports' hockey podcast, Spittin' Chiclets and appears on the spin-off podcast Chiclets Game Notes with former teammate Colby Armstrong.

Playing career
As a youth, Murley played in the 1993 Quebec International Pee-Wee Hockey Tournament with a minor ice hockey team from Syracuse, New York.

Before his professional career, Murley played college hockey for four seasons at the Rensselaer Polytechnic Institute in Troy, NY. He was drafted in the 2nd round (51st overall) by the Pittsburgh Penguins in the 1999 NHL Entry Draft, although he did not choose to report to Pittsburgh until 2002. Murley played with the Wilkes-Barre/Scranton Penguins of the American Hockey League (AHL) before being called up for the 2003–2004 season.

In 2006, Murley's contract with Pittsburgh terminated and Murley signed as a free-agent with the Colorado Avalanche. After playing a full season with Colorado's then AHL affiliate, Albany River Rats, Murley's one-year deal expired and on July 20, 2007, he signed a one-year contract with the Phoenix Coyotes. After splitting the season between Phoenix and their AHL affiliate, the San Antonio Rampage, Murley signed a one-year deal with the Carolina Hurricanes. He was expected to be spending more time near his hometown of Troy as he was expected to join the then-Carolina AHL affiliate Albany River Rats for a second time. As expected, Carolina reassigned Murley to the AHL's Albany River Rats. However, instead of joining Albany, Murley informed the Hurricanes that he was signing with Khabarovsk Amur, of the Kontinental Hockey League (KHL) in Russia. Murley signed with Khabarovsk on October 9, 2009 and finished his season in the KHL.

On October 6, 2009, Murley signed with Langenthal of the Swiss National League B (NLB) in Switzerland. He has also played for Lugano of the Swiss National League A (NLA) and the Rapperswil-Jona Lakers of the NLA.

On September 1, 2010, Murley signed a two-month contract with the Swedish Elite League (SEL) club Linköpings HC.  On October 19, 2010 the tryout contract was terminated. On November 25, 2010, Murley signed a two-month contract with Timrå IK. Murley finished the season with fifteen points in thirty-two games.

On January 20, 2011, Murley signed an extension with Timrå IK that would keep him on the team throughout the 2011-12 Elitserien season. Murley was extended because he was "a player that fits in all situations and because he fit in well with Timrå IK".

On July 9, 2013, Murley signed as a free agent to a contract with the newest member of Kontinental Hockey League, KHL Medveščak Zagreb from Croatia. He joined fellow KHL team HC Slovan Bratislava of Slovakia for the 2014-15 season.

Murley headed to the German top-tier Deutsche Eishockey Liga (DEL) for the 2015-16 season, agreeing to terms with the Nürnberg Ice Tigers. He left Nürnberg in the summer of 2016 and signed with Japanese side Oji Eagles in July 2016. After one season with the Eagles, Murley continued in the Asian League, playing his last two professional seasons with South Korean Incheon-based team Daemyung Killer Whales.

After being retired for 2 1/2 years, Murley returned to pro hockey finishing the 2021-22 season for Kovlands Ishockeyförening in the Swedish second division.

Career statistics

Awards and honors

References

External links

1979 births
Living people
Albany River Rats players
American men's ice hockey left wingers
American expatriate ice hockey players in Russia
Amur Khabarovsk players
Daemyung Killer Whales players
Ice hockey players from New York (state)
KHL Medveščak Zagreb players
Linköping HC players
HC Lugano players
Sportspeople from Troy, New York
Oji Eagles players
Phoenix Coyotes players
Pittsburgh Penguins draft picks
Pittsburgh Penguins players
SC Rapperswil-Jona Lakers players
RPI Engineers men's ice hockey players
Rensselaer Polytechnic Institute alumni
San Antonio Rampage players
SC Langenthal players
HC Slovan Bratislava players
Thomas Sabo Ice Tigers players
Timrå IK players
Wilkes-Barre/Scranton Penguins players
AHCA Division I men's ice hockey All-Americans
American expatriate ice hockey players in Slovakia
American expatriate ice hockey players in Sweden
American expatriate ice hockey players in Switzerland
American expatriate ice hockey players in South Korea
American expatriate ice hockey players in Germany
American expatriate ice hockey players in Japan
American expatriate ice hockey players in Croatia